William P. Mahoney Jr. (November 27, 1916 – April 27, 2000) was an American attorney who served as the United States Ambassador to Ghana from 1962 to 1965. He is the father of Richard Mahoney, and the son of W. P. Mahoney (William P. Mahoney Sr.), a former Arizona state senator.

References

1916 births
2000 deaths
Ambassadors of the United States to Ghana
Arizona Democrats
20th-century American diplomats